XEANT-AM (La Voz de las Huastecas – "The Voice of the Huastecas") is an indigenous community radio station
that broadcasts in Spanish, Nahuatl, Pame and Huastec (Tének) from Tancanhuitz de Santos in the Mexican state of San Luis Potosí. It is run by the Cultural Indigenist Broadcasting System (SRCI) of the National Commission for the Development of Indigenous Peoples (CDI).

XEANT's radio programming has been studied as an example of decolonization and the promotion of traditional knowledge and values.

Programming
A 2017 annual work report for XEANT highlighted the Plaza Pública (Public Plaza) radio show, which is produced in Tének or Nahuatl each weekend in a different community and includes music by traditional Huapango trios. According to the report, Plaza Pública has been so popular that many local community assemblies have submitted petitions to have the show produced in their communities.

In 2020 the station broadcast information about COVID-19 prevention in Nahuatl and Tének.

External links
XEANT website

References

Sistema de Radiodifusoras Culturales Indígenas
Radio stations in San Luis Potosí
Radio stations established in 1990
Nahuatl-language radio stations
Daytime-only radio stations in Mexico